Russ Witte (born 1916 or 1917)  is the current U.S. Masters Swimming National Record Holder  for the 95- to 99-year-old age group in the 50-yard, 100-yard and 200-yard breaststroke events swum in 2012. He is the reigning National Champion for 2013 in the 50 yard backstroke, 50, 100, and 200 yard breaststroke. 

Russ swims for Ohio Masters Swim Club. His sons, James and Ray, 54 and 60 respectively , coach and swim with him.

He swam the Great Ohio River Swim.

References 

1910s births
Living people
American male backstroke swimmers
American male breaststroke swimmers
20th-century American people